Brigid Mae Power is an Irish singer, songwriter, and musician.

Early life 

Power was born in London, England to Irish parents. Her family relocated to Ireland when she was twelve years old. She learned to play the button accordion before starting to sing and play piano as a teen.

Career 

Power began releasing music under the name Brigid Power-Ryce in 2010. Her debut EP You Are Here was released by the independent label Rusted Rail in 2010. This was followed by two self released EPS, Ode to an Emryo in 2011, and Eee Tuts in 2013. The live album I Told You The Truth was released in 2014 by the label Abandon Reason. Power recorded the album in the St. Nicholas Collegiate Church, Galway city. The Irish Times wrote of the album "the setting gives her haunting vocals a spiritual resonance". After meeting American musician and future husband Peter Broderick at a gig, Power travelled to Broderick's studio in Portland, Oregon in 2015 to record her debut studio album. After finishing the production of her debut album, she received a two-album deal from American label Tompkins Square Records.

Her debut self titled album Brigid Mae Power was released in 2016 and was a critical success, receiving positive reviews from Pitchfork, Record Collector, and The Guardian.
In an interview with Uncut, Power stated the album was inspired by her experiences as a single mother.
Power promoted the album with a tour of the UK and Japan.

Her second studio album  The Two Worlds was released in 2018. The album was met with widespread critical acclaim from the music press, with Pitchfork writing "The Two Worlds is Power's most ambitious and her most introspective". The album received 4 star reviews from Uncut, The Guardian and Record Collector. The Line of Best Fit wrote "Stately, solemn, slow-burning and seriously beautiful, most of The Two Worlds isn't far removed from its predecessor's intimate templates".

Power's third album, Head Above the Water, was released in 2020 by Fire Records.

In 2021, she appeared on Other Voices (Irish TV series).

Discography 

Albums

 Brigid Mae Power (2016)
 The Two Worlds (2018)
 Head Above the Water (2020)

EPS

 You Are Here (2010)
 Ode To An Embryo (2011)
 Eee Tuts (2013) 
 The Ones You Keep Close (2017)
 Burning Your Light (2021)

Live Albums

 I Told You The Truth (2014)

References

External links 
 Official site

Irish musicians
Year of birth missing (living people)
Living people